Gayathri Govind, is an Indian classical dancer, choreographer, actor and the winner of Asianet's Vodafone Thakadimi in 2008.

She is trained in Bharatanatyam, Mohiniyattam, Kuchipudi, Ottanmthullal, Kathakali, Kathak and Keralanadanam. She has been performing on various stages in India and abroad from the age of four. She is also a well known Choreographer and owns her own dance troupe ''Silver Streak" in Trivandrum. She anchored many TV programs and live shows on Kairali TV, Asianet, Surya TV, Mazhavil Manorama, Kairali We, Asianet News, BTV, Doordarsan, ACV. She is the model of the famous Tea Brand Society Tea. She was working as a Software Engineer in HCL Technologies, Chennai and now resides in Trivandrum. She runs a dance school, Takadhimi in Chennai and Trivandrum.

On 16 October 2015 she won the Golden Women Award 2015 for the category Entertainment, Media and Comm at Helsinki, Finland.

She has performed Mohiniyattom and Kuchipudi recitals for the prestigious Soorya Festival in the years 2012 and 2013.Gayathri was also a part of the Soorya Production 'Gaandharam'.

Gayathri's dance productions are 'Bhavasamhitha' (a collaboration of dance, music, light and sound), 'Aadiparasakthi' (a multimedia dance production ) Rama Ramethi (A walk with Rama).

Website 
 www.gayathrigovind.com

Education 
Gayathri did her schooling in Holy Angel's Convent, Trivandrum and graduated in Bachelor of technology from Mar Baselios College, Trivandrum. She  completed  the course ''Healing with the Arts'' from University of Florida. Gayathri completed her Masters in Dance and is a diploma holder in Digital Media Production .

Awards
 Won Golden Women Award 2015 for category Entertainment, Media and Comm.
 Winner of Asianet's Vodafone Thakadimi in 2008.
 Won 1st Prize in DHOOM Pro in 2007.
 Won many laurels in State and University level youth festivals.

Filmography

Commercials

Movies

Web series

Short films

References

External links

 In The Hindu News after winning Thakadhimi
 Feat of perfection The Hindu News
 Aadiparasakthi Dance Production
 The World Women News Interview
 Writeup Mollywood Dancer
 Bhavasamhitha

Indian women choreographers
Indian choreographers
Living people
Malayali people
Artists from Thiruvananthapuram
Performers of Indian classical dance
Mohiniyattam exponents
Indian dance teachers
Bharatanatyam exponents
Indian female classical dancers
Dancers from Kerala
Actresses from Thiruvananthapuram
Year of birth missing (living people)
21st-century Indian actresses
21st-century Indian dancers
Women artists from Kerala